OutRight International (OutRight) is an LGBTIQ human rights non-governmental organization that addresses human rights violations and abuses against lesbian, gay, bisexual, transgender and intersex people. OutRight International documents human rights discrimination and abuses based on their sexual orientation, gender identity, gender expression and sex characteristics in partnership with activists, advocates, media, NGOs and allies on a local, regional, national and international level. OutRight International holds consultative status with ECOSOC.

History 

OutRight International, formerly known as International Gay and Lesbian Human Rights Commission (IGLHRC), was founded by Julie Dorf in 1990, and incorporated as a non-profit organization on November 7, 1990. Though initially focused on LGBT human rights abuses in Russia, the organization is now active in many parts of the world, including the Americas, Africa, the Middle East, and Asia. OutRight International is headquartered in New York City with satellite offices on the West Coast and in Spain, and Manila. OutRight International has a digital archive of their LGBT human rights documentation and education materials for research.

On July 19, 2010, the United Nations Economic and Social Council voted to accredit IGLHRC as one of the NGOs granted consultative status with the international organization. This allows IGLHRC to attend U.N meetings, contribute statements, and collaborate with United Nations agencies.

In 2010, IGLHRC contributed in forming "An Activist's Guide" of the Yogyakarta Principles.

In 2015, on the 25th anniversary of the International Gay and Lesbian Human Rights Commission (IGLHRC), the organization changed its name to OutRight Action International to make it more inclusive.

In 2015, OutRight's executive director Jessica Stern presented the first United Nations Security Council briefing on LGBTI human rights violations.

In 2015, OutRight in partnership with CUNY Law School started a one-day conference on Human Rights Day called OutSummit.

In 2016, as a member of the United Nations LGBTI Core Group (LGBT rights at the United Nations), OutRight took part in a high level UN event that included the 8th Secretary General Ban Ki-Moon, 47th United States Vice President Joe Biden, President of Chile, Michelle Bachelet and Prime Minister of Norway, Erna Solberg

In 2017, OutRight challenged the inclusion of C-Fam to the US delegation at the UN CSW 2017.

In 2018, Neish McLean, Executive Director of TransWave and OutRight Caribbean Program Officer, presented the intervention statement on behalf of the Major Groups and Other Stakeholders in response to Jamaica’s Voluntary National Reviews at the United Nations.

In 2019, OutRight worked with UN Women to be a part of a historic panel at the United Nations on "Gender Diversity: Beyond Binaries"

In 2022, OutRight dropped "Action" from its name, formally becoming OutRight International.

Programs 
OutRight’s work is organized in four regional programs (Asia, the Middle East and North Africa, sub-Saharan Africa and Latin America and the Caribbean), and cross-regional programs focused on the United Nations, global research and safety and security for LGBTIQ activists.

Work in the Asia region promotes acceptance of sexual and gender diversity at all levels of
society. The 2014 Report "Violence: Through The Lens of Lesbians, Bisexual Women And Trans People in Asia" collected and reviewed data from five countries in the region. Recent projects focused on domestic violence protections for LGBT in the Philippines and Sri Lanka.

Work in the Caribbean region supports organizations to achieve legal registration and provides support in establishing and building the capacity of newly founded organizations as well as combating gender-based violence.

Research program
OutRight International’s Research Program collects quantitative and qualitative data through surveys and case studies to promote global LGBTIQ advocacy and address issues on religion, culture, policy, government, and social norms of gender sexuality, gender expression, and sexual orientation. This research is analyzed for use by local, regional, international and communications fronts.

 Outright conducted the first-ever global survey in 2019 "Harmful Treatment: The Global Reach of So-called Conversion Therapy" on the causes and effects of "conversion therapy" using interviews with experts and survivors around the world. The report dives into its main justifications by perpetrators, the most common conversion therapy practices used, and includes cases studies from people who have been through such programs. The survey provides insight on the social, cultural, and religious norms which undermine the identities and sexualities of LGBTIQ people.
 A survey in 2018 "The Global State of LGBTIQ Organizing: The Right to Register" in 194 countries and found that only 56%, 109 countries, permit LGBTIQ organizations to register as so. In just 28%, 55 countries, LGBTIQ organizations exist but they cannot legally register. OutRight is concerned that LGBTIQ people in these countries may be at higher risk of discrimination and violence, as well as lack resources and funding.
 Partnered with local LGBTIQ groups in the Middle East and North Africa (MENA), with a focus on Iran, Iraq, and Turkey, to support activists and allies. The 2018 report “Activism and Resilience: LGBTQ Progress in the Middle East and North Africa” explains how activism in the region leads to progress on LGBTQ issues, and how challenges are met with the resilience by the movement.

United Nations program
OutRight is the first and only U.S.-based LGBTIQ human rights organization to obtain
consultative status with the United Nations Economic and Social Council (ECOSOC). OutRight
uses its status to work as an organizer convening of groups and activists coming to New York to conduct advocacy on LGBTIQ issues at the United Nations. OutRight does direct advocacy work across the United Nations with a focus on the General Assembly, Commission on the Status of Women, and High-level Political Forum on Sustainable Development. Two OutRight events bridge UN direct advocacy work with global LGBTIQ activists and advocates: Advocacy Week and the UN Religious Fellowship. OutRight engages relevant national, regional and international stakeholders, including UN member State missions, UN special mechanisms, UN agencies and the UN Secretariat to support LGBTIQ rights at UN headquarters, including the United Nations LGBTI Core Group.

Awards

Felipa de Souza Award
Since 1994, OutRight confers an annual award, the Felipa de Souza Award, to honour a human rights activist or organization.

Outspoken Award
OutRight occasionally presents the Outspoken Award to special honorees. The Outspoken Award "recognizes the leadership of a global ally to the lesbian, gay, bisexual, transgender and intersex (LGBTI) community whose outspokenness has contributed substantially to advancing the rights and understanding of LGBTI people everywhere."

See also

 LGBTIQ rights
 LGBT rights at the United Nations
 Universal Declaration of Human Rights
 List of LGBT-related organizations and conferences
 Intersex civil society organizations
 Intersex human rights
 Intersex rights by country
 World Pride
 Sexual Orientation
 Gender Identity
 IDAHOT
 Transgender rights
 List of transgender-rights organizations
 Violence against LGBT people

References

External links
 

LGBT rights organizations
Gender identity
Organizations based in New York City
Organizations established in 1990